Dubois County Courthouse is a historic courthouse located at Jasper, Dubois County, Indiana.  It was designed by the architectural firm Milburn & Heister and built between 1909 and 1911.  It is a three-story, Classical Revival style reinforced concrete and masonry building. It features a cupola that rises 100 feet high and pedimented porticos with Ionic order columns.  Also on the property is the contributing Soldiers and Sailors Monument erected in 1894.

It was added to the National Register of Historic Places in 1996.

Gallery

References

County courthouses in Indiana
Courthouses on the National Register of Historic Places in Indiana
Neoclassical architecture in Indiana
Government buildings completed in 1911
Jasper, Indiana
Buildings and structures in Dubois County, Indiana
National Register of Historic Places in Dubois County, Indiana
1911 establishments in Indiana